Kakki may refer to:

 Kakki 1, a town and union council of Bannu District in Pakistan
 Kakki 2, a town and union council of Bannu District in Pakistan
Kakki nau, a village in Jhang district, Pakistan
Kakki Reservoir in Pathanamthitta district of Kerala, India

See also
 Kaki (disambiguation)
 Khaki (disambiguation)